Bridget Drinka (born 1951) is an American linguist who specializes in Indo-European and historical linguistics. She is Professor of Linguistics at the University of Texas at San Antonio.

Biography
Bridget Drinka received her B.A. (1973) from the University of Illinois at Urbana–Champaign, her M.S. (1977) from Georgetown University, and her Ph.D. (1990) from the University of Texas at Austin, specializing in Indo-European and historical linguistics. Drinka joined the faculty at UTSA in 1991, where she has since served as Assistant Professor (1991-1998), Associate Professor (1998-2012), and Professor of Linguistics (2012-).

Drinka was a Fulbright Senior Lecturer at Moscow State University in 1998, and has been a visiting professor in Germany, Italy, and Japan. Drinka was President of the International Society for Historical Linguistics from 2015 to 2017, and is Associate Editor of Folia Linguistica Historica. Her book Language Contact in Europe (2017) was awarded the Leonard Bloomfield Book Award for 2018 by the Linguistic Society of America.

Selected works
 The Sigmatic Aorist in Indo-European, 1995
 Language Contact in Europe, 2017

See also
 Winfred P. Lehmann
 Joseph C. Salmons
 Carol F. Justus

References

External links

1951 births
Linguists from the United States
Women linguists
Indo-Europeanists
Linguists of Indo-European languages
Living people
Georgetown University alumni
Historical linguists
Sociolinguists
University of Texas at Austin alumni
University of Texas at Austin faculty
University of Illinois Urbana-Champaign alumni